Teresa Castaldo has been the Italian Ambassador to France since January 25, 2018 and was Ambassador to Argentina from September 13, 2013 until January 24, 2018.

See also 
 Ministry of Foreign Affairs (Italy)
 Foreign relations of Italy

External links
France summons Italian envoy over Di Maio's migrant remarks

References

Italian women ambassadors
Ambassadors of Italy to Argentina
Ambassadors of Italy to France
Year of birth missing (living people)
Living people
Italian diplomats